The 1988 Volvo U.S. National Indoor was a men's tennis tournament played on indoor hard courts at the Racquet Club of Memphis in Memphis, Tennessee in the United States that was part of the 1988 Nabisco Grand Prix. It was the 18th edition of the tournament was held from February 15 through February 21, 1988. First-seeded Andre Agassi won the singles title.

Finals

Singles

 Andre Agassi defeated  Mikael Pernfors 6–4, 6–4, 7–5
 It was Agassi's 1st singles title of the year and the 2nd of his career.

Doubles

 Kevin Curren /  David Pate defeated  Peter Lundgren /  Mikael Pernfors 6–2, 6–2

References

External links
 ITF tournament edition details

Volvo U.S. National Indoor
U.S. National Indoor Championships
Tennis in Tennessee
Volvo U.S. National Indoor
Volvo U.S. National Indoor
Volvo U.S. National Indoor